Maigret and the Killer is a 1969 detective novel by the Belgian writer Georges Simenon featuring his character Jules Maigret. The book was translated into English by Shaun Whiteside.

References 

1969 French novels
Maigret novels
1969 Belgian novels